Chinnarat Phadungsil (born 1 November 1988) is a Thai professional golfer who plays on the Asian Tour and the European Tour.

Chinnarat was born in Chantaburi, Thailand. As an amateur, he won tournaments in Asia, Australia and the United States. His most notable win came at the 15-17 age group event at the Junior World Golf Championships in San Diego, California. He won the 2005 Double A International Open on the Asian Tour at the age of 17 years and five days, becoming the youngest person to win on the Asian Tour. He trailed by five shots going into the final round but forced a playoff with a final round of 67 which included three birdies on the final holes. He defeated Shiv Kapur in a playoff to win the tournament. The win also made him the third amateur to win a professional tournament in Asia. He turned professional right after the victory.

Chinnarat won his second event on the Asian Tour at the 2006 Crowne Plaza Open. He was two shots back with three holes left in the tournament and birdied holes 16 and 18 to force a playoff. He defeated Prom Meesawat and Lin Wen-tang in the playoff. As a rookie on tour, he finished in 29th on the Order of Merit. He almost picked up his third Asian Tour victory at the 2007 Midea China Classic but fell to Thaworn Wiratchant in a playoff. He finished 20th on the Order of Merit in 2007. In 2008 he recorded four top-10 finishes and finished in 38th on the Order of Merit. He earned his European Tour card for 2009 by finished T12 at qualifying school.

Chinnarat won his third event on the Asian Tour at the 2009 Queen's Cup. He entered the final round a stroke behind the leader but a final round of 67 (-4) including three birdies on the last five holes saw him win the tournament by a margin of three strokes.

Amateur wins
2001 Asia Pacific Junior Golf Championship
2002 Jack Newton Junior Golf Championship (Australia)
2003 Sprint International Amateur Golf Championship (USA)
2004 Asia Pacific Junior Masters
2005 Junior World Golf Championships (Boys 15-17)

Professional wins (5)

Asian Tour wins (3)

Asian Tour playoff record (2–1)

Japan Challenge Tour wins (1)

All Thailand Golf Tour wins (1)
2015 Singha Open

Results in World Golf Championships

"T" = Tied

Team appearances
Amateur
Eisenhower Trophy (representing Thailand): 2004
Putra Cup (representing Thailand): 2004 (winners)

See also
2008 European Tour Qualifying School graduates

External links

Chinnarat Phadungsil
Asian Tour golfers
European Tour golfers
Chinnarat Phadungsil
1988 births
Living people